Kuniaki Shibata (柴田 国明, born March 29, 1947, in Hitachi, Japan) is a  Japanese former professional boxer who competed from 1965 to 1977. He is a world champion in two weight classes, having held the WBC and [[The Ring (magazine)|The Ring]] featherweight titles from 1970 to 1972, the WBA and The Ring'' super-featherweight titles in 1973, and the WBC super-featherweight title from 1974 to 1975.

Biography 
Shibata won his debut match in 1965 with a first-round knockout, and fought for the Oriental and Pacific Boxing Federation featherweight title in 1969, but lost by sixth-round knockout. In April 1970 he challenged for the vacant Japanese featherweight title, and won by tenth-round knockout. He relinquished the title to challenge WBC featherweight champion Vicente Saldivar, and won the title when Saldivar gave up after the twelfth round.

He made his first defense by first-round knockout, and retained his title in his second defense with a draw, but lost to Clemente Sanchez in May, 1972.

Shibata moved up to super featherweight, and got his second world title shot against Lineal and WBA champion Ben Villaflor in Honolulu on March 12, 1973. He won by fifteen-round unanimous decision to capture his second world title.

Shibata made one defense in Japan before returning to the United States to fight Ben Villaflor again for his second defense. Shibata lost by knockout less than 2 minutes into the first round to lose his second world title.

On February 28, 1974, he challenged Ricardo Arredondo for the WBC super featherweight title, and won by unanimous decision for his third world title. He defended the title three times before losing to Alfredo Escalera in 1975. He attempted another comeback, but announced his retirement in 1977. His record was 47-6-3 (25 KOs).

Shibata was a short and speedy fighter, who took advantage of even the slightest openings to throw in a flurry of punches. However, he also had a very weak chin, and was very susceptible to counter punches. Five of his six career losses were by knockout. He and former WBC lightweight champion Guts Ishimatsu were gym mates, and both fighters were trained by Eddie Townsend.

Professional boxing record

See also 
List of super featherweight boxing champions
Lineal championship
List of WBA world champions
List of WBC world champions
List of Japanese boxing world champions
Boxing in Japan

References

External links 
 
Kuniaki Shibata - CBZ Profile

|-

|-

|-

|-

|-

1947 births
Living people
World Boxing Association champions
World Boxing Council champions
World boxing champions
People from Hitachi, Ibaraki
Japanese male boxers
Super-featherweight boxers